Wawrzyniec Staliński (28 July 1899 – 3 June 1985) was a Polish international footballer who played for the national team in the 1920s. During his career he played for Posnania Poznań, and Warta Poznań where he won the Polish national championship in 1929. He appeared 13 times for his country scoring 11 goals. He was also part of Romania's squad for the football tournament at the 1924 Summer Olympics, but he did not play in any matches.

References

1899 births
1985 deaths
People from Oborniki County
Warta Poznań players
Poland international footballers
Polish footballers
Sportspeople from Greater Poland Voivodeship
Association football forwards